The Fender Lead Series was produced by the Fender/Rogers/Rhodes Division of CBS Musical Instruments. The series comprised Lead I, Lead II, Lead III and Lead Bass models.

General features 
 Manufactured Fall 1979 through 1982.
 Vintage style "Soft C" profile neck with a  radius.
 Neck width at nut , plus applied finish thickness on 1981 models.
 Truss rod adjustment at the heel of the neck.
 2 vintage style string trees.
 21 medium frets.
 "F" tuners (West German-manufactured), and "F" 4 bolt neck plate w/plastic pad.
 3 Ply BWB through 1981 and WBW through 1982 pickguard with foil backing.
 White plastic nut.
  scale length.
 Hardtail through-body mounted strings.
 The saddle screws used lock nuts, not springs.
 Comes with a tolex or moulded plastic case.

History 
The original concept for the Lead guitar series, including the name "Lead" came from Dennis Handa, then Marketing director for Fender Guitars. The idea was to have a guitar that was cheaper than the Stratocaster and be attractive to players because of the neck feel as well as the pickup options. The smaller headstock and the neck were both patterned after earlier Fender necks. Originally Steve Morse of the Dixie Dregs was the first endorser of the guitar and premiered it at a NAMM Show show in Atlanta, Georgia. The Lead Guitars were manufactured between 1979 and 1982 by the Fender Musical Equipment Co. under the direction of Gregg Wilson and Freddie Tavares. Gregg Wilson was succeeded by John Page, who eventually headed the Fender Custom Shop. The Lead Series have elements of the Stratocaster and Telecaster in their design with a body that is slightly smaller and with a slightly different shape than the Stratocaster, a Stratocaster-like neck (and headstock), and hardtail bridge with Telecaster-like string ferrules on the back of the body.

The Lead Series headstock was smaller than that of the then Stratocaster models and similar though not identical to the 1954 Stratocaster design. The Stratocaster models at the time of the Lead Series release in late 1979 were still using the larger headstock design until the introduction of the Dan Smith Stratocaster in 1981. At some point during 1982 the lower bout of the headstock was shifted towards the body giving the headstock a more elongated look.

The Lead Series were manufactured at Fender's Fullerton, California plant and priced below the Stratocaster models of the time (approx. $495.00). They were eventually replaced in Fender's line up by the Squier JV model in 1982 as Fender expanded its operations by starting Fender Japan. 

In January 2020 Fender reintroduced the Lead II and III as a part of their Player series. These Made in Mexico recreations sport an alder body, two slanted alnico V single coils (Lead II), alnico II humbuckers (Lead III) and a modern C-shaped maple neck with maple or pau ferro fretboard, 9.5” radius, 22 medium jumbo frets. Other features include a synthetic bone nut, "F" tuners and a string-through-body bridge with block saddles.

Notable users

Notable guitar players who have utilized the Fender Lead series include:
 Bono of U2 (used during the War Tour in 1983; can be seen playing a black model in the Live at Red Rocks: Under a Blood Red Sky video)
 Eric Clapton
 Elliot Easton of The Cars ("Touch and Go" guitar solo from the Panorama album)
 Roger Miller of Mission of Burma
 Steve Morse of the Dixie Dregs and Deep Purple ("Punk Sandwich" track from the album Night of the Living Dregs by the Dixie Dregs)
 Moon Martin's Street Fever sleeve shows a Lead I
 A. Savage of Parquet Courts
 Zé Pedro of Xutos & Pontapés
 Annie Clark of St Vincent
 Hélder Dias of Flama and Canalha
 Pablo Mondello of Massacre Palestina
 HeWhoCannotBeNamed of The Dwarves
 Pat Place of Bush Tetras
Chris Boerner of The Hot at Nights and Hiss Golden Messenger
Greg "Bonzo" Bonsignore Alien Love
Bobby Dill of The Anniversary Effect 
Claudio Narea of Los Prisioneros
Lynn Gunn of PVRIS (in the official music video for the song “My Way”)
Greg Koch

Models 
 Lead I, 1979–1982: A single bridge-position split humbucker. Three-position coil selector switch (single coil, both coils, single coil), two-position humbucker series/parallel select switch which operates only when both coils are selected (middle position). Master volume and tone controls.
 Lead II, 1979–1982: Two X-1 single coil pickups, one at the neck, and the other at the bridge. The X-1 pickup was also used in the bridge position on the "STRAT" and the "Dan Smith Stratocaster" models. Three-position pickup selector switch (neck, neck and bridge, bridge), two-position phase shift switch (in phase, out of phase) which operates only when both pickups are selected (middle position). Master volume and tone controls.
 Lead III, 1982: Two humbuckers, one at the neck, the other at the bridge. Three-position pickup selector switch (neck, neck and bridge, bridge), three-position coil selector switch (neck single-coil, both coils neck or bridge, bridge single-coil) which determines if a single coil or both coils of each pickup will be selected. Master volume and tone controls.
 Lead Bass: This instrument never went into production. A photo of a 1979 prototype appears in Klaus Blasquiz's 1990 book The Fender Bass, features two slanted single-coil pickups, and has a 34” scale.

Technical information 

Fender Lead I/III Humbucker Pickup Specifications

The DC resistance of the Lead I/III Seth Lover designed humbucker pickup is approximately 13 kΩ.
The Lead I/III humbucker pickups have 12 adjustable pole pieces and have a ceramic magnet.

Fender Lead II Single Coil Pickup Specifications

The DC resistance of the Lead II X-1 single coil pickup is approximately 7.5 kΩ (9600 coil winds) vrs (7600 coil winds) on a Stratocaster.
Lead II single coil pickups have flat alnico polepieces.
Early Lead II single coil pickups have bobbins formed of green/grey fibreboard and later Lead II single coil pickups have plastic moulded bobbins that are the same as that used on current Stratocasters.

Fender Lead Series General Specifications

The Lead Series use 250 kΩ volume and tone potentiometers and use 0.05 µF tone capacitors.
The body is usually made of 3 pieces of either alder or ash while the necks are maple with a walnut 'skunk stripe' on their backs and a matching plug on the face of the headstock covering the end of the truss rod.

Maple fingerboarded necks are made of one piece of maple (no separate fingerboard) while rosewood fingerboarded necks have a thick veneer of rosewood stuck over the pre-radiused face of the neck. While the lead neck is approximately .04 in narrower at the nut than typical Fender Telecasters and Stratocasters of that era, the neck width at the 21st fret is the same as the Stratocaster and Tele (measuring 2.182 inches).

The pickup body routing is the same for the Lead I and the Lead II models (humbucker bridge and single coil neck routing).  The grounding system in all three of the series didn't stop with the foiled backing on the pickguard. A ground strap was screwed to the body routing pocket between the bridge pickup and the pickup selector switch cavity. The body pockets were covered with a conductive coating.  The bridge ground wire was connected here with a common connection to the pickguard ground.

Later year Fender Lead models have a more contoured body and there are two subtle variations in headstock shape, one of which (softer contour) used tooling dating back to the 1950s Stratocaster (as with the Dan Smith Stratocaster).  Neck profile and headstock thickness varied slightly throughout the production run for all Fender Lead models of different years.
Many instruments used a polyurethane finish which is brittle, chips easily, and develops spider cracks if exposed to extremes of heat or cold. The finish is also prone to clouding.

Serial Numbers 
The Fender Lead Series used a modified version of the Fender United States serial number format. The first letter E designated the eighties, and the next two numbers (00, 01, or 02) indicated the year of manufacture. For example, E01XXXX = 1981.

Fender Lead Series guitar serial numbers were installed on the headstock, inside body pocket, and back of the pick guard. An all original model may have the same serial number identifier on each of these major parts.

References 

Lead Series
Musical instruments invented in the 1970s
1980s in music